Dalmazio Moner (1291 - 24 September 1341) was a Spanish Roman Catholic priest and a professed member of the Order of Preachers from Girona. Moner lived a humble life of solitude at his convent in Girona and later lived a period in France in a cave before being summoned back to Girona where he later died.

His beatification received formal ratification from Pope Innocent XIII on 13 August 1721 after the latter confirmed the late friar's local 'cultus' - or popular devotion.

Life
Dalmazio Moner was born in 1291 in Spain - under Aragonese monarchical rule - to Catalan nobles. He studied in both his hometown of Girona and in Montpellier.

He became a professed member of the Order of Preachers in Girona at the age of fifteen in 1306 and was later ordained to the priesthood at some point. Moner never wore a habit that was not in tatters and he picked up items of clothing from his fellow friars that were worn out and wore them as both a humble act of poorness and a penitential act. The friar never consumed fish or eggs and he instead lived on a diet of unseasoned vegetables and hard bread though he added a few ashes to such meals during each Lent. He also slept on bare earth and he often visited a local church to reflect and take an occasional nap in which he rested his head on the altar step. On one occasion a novice tempted to leave the order received a visit from Moner who convinced him otherwise and saw the novice remain in the order and on another occasion refused to help a mother heal her child of a serious sight disease after he said the disease would save him from serious sin and that God would decide the right time for the child to be healed. Moner did not speak to women much though when he did he turned his back to them and spoke over his shoulder. He refused all administrative offices offered to him. He was also commissioned to found a convent in Castellón de Ampurias and after its construction returned to Girona in 1331.

Sometime in the last four decades of his life he relocated to southern France and lived in Marseille in the cave that was said to be the place where Mary Magdalene once lived in and he ventured there as part of a pilgrimage. He left the cave just to attend choir sessions and to attend Mass. In 1334 he began his life of solitude in the cave and then in 1337 he returned to Girona after being summoned where he spent the remainder of his life in his convent.

He died on 24 September 1341 and his remains were interred in Girona.

Beatification
Moner's beatification received official approval from Pope Innocent XIII on 13 August 1721 after the pontiff ratified a decree that confirmed the late friar's local 'cultus' - otherwise known as popular and enduring veneration to him.

References

External links
The Order of Preachers, Independent

1291 births
1341 deaths
13th-century venerated Christians
13th-century Aragonese Roman Catholic priests
14th-century venerated Christians
14th-century Aragonese Roman Catholic priests
Beatifications by Pope Innocent XIII
Dominican beatified people
Members of the Dominican Order
People from Girona
Spanish beatified people
Spanish Roman Catholic priests
Spanish Dominicans
Venerated Catholics
Venerated Dominicans